The Chicago mayoral election of 1989 saw Democratic nominee Richard M. Daley win election to the remainder of an unexpired mayoral term with a 14% margin of victory. This marked a return for the Daley family to the office of mayor. Daley was elected over Alderman Timothy Evans, the nominee of the newly formed Harold Washington Party, and the Republican nominee Ed Vrdolyak.

The election was held two years earlier than the next regularly scheduled mayoral election due of the death in office of Harold Washington. Eugene Sawyer had been appointed Mayor by the City Council to serve until the special election. He was unseated by Daley in the Democratic primary.

Background
A lawsuit was filed by an anti-Sawyer coalition of black activists and several Harold Washington supporters demanding a special election be held as soon as possible.

On May 5, 1988, Eugene Wachowski, judge of the Cook County Circuit Court, argued that a special election would be required to be held in 1989 on the basis of three previous rulings by Circuit, Appellate, and Supreme Court judges and by a 1978 legislative debate from when the Illinois General Assembly passed the then-current election law.

Nominations

Democratic primary
Richard M. Daley won the Democratic primary, defeating Eugene Sawyer, who had been appointed mayor by City Council following the death of Harold Washington. He also faced Sheila A. Jones and James C. Taylor (State Senator who had also been chief of staff in Jane Byrne's mayoral administration).

Candidates
Richard M. Daley
Sheila A. Jones, candidate for mayor of Chicago in 1987
Eugene Sawyer, incumbent mayor
James C. Taylor, state senator, former chief of staff to Chicago mayor Jane Byrne

Withdrew
Edward M. Burke, alderman
Lawrence S. Bloom, alderman

Denied ballot access
Timothy C. Evans, alderman 
Juan Soliz

Campaign
While Daley was considered a poor public speaker, and sometimes a timid campaigner, he ran an effective campaign. In 1983, he was widely viewed merely as the son of the former mayor Richard J. Daley. In 1987, he had crafted an image of a strong public administrator. Daley's campaign was run by two young consultants that had previously worked on Paul Simon's 1984 United States Senate campaign, David Wilhelm and David Axelrod. His deputy campaign manager was Julie Hamos. His fundraising was headed by John Schmidt and Paul Stepan. Avis LaVelle served as his campaign press spokesperson.

One of Sawyer's first missteps was his choice for campaign leadership. Sawyer's campaign was managed by Louisiana political consultant Reynard Rochon. Rochon, being an outsider to Chicago politics, did not understand many important aspects of it. Additionally, Rochon spent much of his time managing campaign doing so remotely from New Orleans.

Sawyer raised significant funds for his candidacy.

Sawyer was a low-key individual and eschewed interviews.

A media consultant was brought from Boston to film campaign commercial's for Sawyer. Most of the ads filled were positive ads, highlighting the accomplishments of Sawyers brief tenure. However, there were a few ads that attacked Daley by portraying him as stupid and unable to complete a sentence on his own. The campaign overspent on media advertising and failed to spend enough on literature, field operations, and lawn signs.

Sawyer's campaign lacked a strong field operation.

The African-American anti-Sawyer faction, whose members were responsible for the lawsuit that led to the special election being ordered, rallied around Evans, whom they viewed as the proper heir to Washington's political legacy.

Evans' allies criticized Sawyer; one of them, such as Dorothy Tillman, called the mayor an "Uncle Tom." Another alderman in Evans' camp was Bobby Rush. In July 1988, after months of attacks on him, Sawyer retaliated in July 1988 by stripping them of their committee chairmanships in a City Council restructuring.

African-American support was reported to be split between Sawyer and Evans before the latter was taken off of the ballot. Sawyer attempted to broker a deal to get Evans to withdraw from the primary, but in a stroke of luck for Sawyer, Evans was ultimately removed from the ballot.

In December, Edward M. Burke withdrew from the race and endorsed Daley. Just under two weeks before the day of the primary, Alderman Lawrence S. Bloom withdrew his candidacy and endorsed Sawyer. Bloom had entered the race in September 1988 and had originally started his campaign near the front of the pack, benefiting from what the press referred to as a "squeaky clean" reputation.

During the campaign, Daley and Sawyer avoided lodging personal attacks, and both called for racial harmony.

Endorsements

Results

Daley won a majority of the vote in 31 of the city's 50 wards, with Sawyer winning a majority of the vote in the remaining 19 wards.

Results by ward

Voter turnout was 200,000 less in the primary than it had been in the regularly-scheduled mayoral primary two years prior. The decrease was even more pronounced in black neighborhoods than it had been in white neighborhoods.

According to a New York Times—WBBM-TV poll found that Daley received 91% of the white vote, to Sawyers 8%. It found, in contrast, that Sawyer received 94% of the black vote, to Daley's 5%. The poll also found that Jewish and Hispanic voters, who Sawyer had hoped to capture the support of, had strongly went for Daley. It found that Daley got 83% of the Jewish vote, to Sawyer's 15%. It also found that Daley got 84% of the Hispanic vote, to Sawyer's 15%. Additionally, the poll found that three-fourths of whites that had previously voted for Harold Washington voted for Daley.

Republican primary

Candidates
William J. Grutzmacher.
Kenneth R. Hurst
Herbert Sohn, urologist

Write-in candidates
Edward Vrdolyak, alderman, former chairman of the Cook County Democratic Party, 1987 Illinois Solidarity Party nominee for mayor

Withdrew
John Holowinski
Edmund Kelly, former Chicago Park District superintendent
Bernard Stone, Chicago alderman

Denied ballot access
Alfred Walter Balciunas,
Edward L. Bowe
Arthur J. Jones, neo-Nazi
Gene Kulichenko
Dean Rosenburg
Jon Silverstein

Campaign
Less than two weeks before the day of the primary election, a movement emerged to draft 1987 Illinois Solidarity Party nominee Edward Vrdolyak as a write-in candidate for the Republican primary. Vrdolyak obliged, launching a last-minute a write-in campaign for the nomination only a week before the late February primary. He narrowly defeated Herbert Sohn. Sohn had held the backing of the Republican Party establishment.

An additional candidate seeking the nomination, John Holowinski, had withdrawn from the race in late January. Former parks superintendent Edmund Kelly was another individual who was initially a candidate but withdrew before the primary.

Harold Washington Party nomination

Timothy C. Evans, who had been unable to run for the Democratic nomination due to issues regarding his petition, received the Harold Washington Party's nomination.

Independent candidates
Independent candidate Peter Davis Kauss saw his name excluded from the ballot due to issues with his petition.

General election

Results
Daley won the election by a double-digit margin.

Daley became the fifth (and, currently, the most recent) mayor to come from the city's Bridgeport neighborhood (after Edward J. Kelly, Martin H. Kennelly, Richard J. Daley, and Michael Bilandic).

Daley carried a majority of the vote in 31 of the city's 50 wards, with Evans carrying a majority of the vote in the remaining 19 wards.

Vroldyak only saw double-digit percentage of the votes in the 10th ward, which he had previously represented as an alderman. Elsewhere he saw only single-digit percentage of the vote.

Results by ward

References

1989
Chicago
1989 Illinois elections
1980s in Chicago
1989 in Illinois
Chicago
Chicago mayoral 1989
Richard M. Daley